Warren Avenue is a QLine streetcar station in Detroit, Michigan. The station opened for service on May 12, 2017, and is located in Midtown Detroit. The station services the Detroit Medical Center, the Cultural Center neighborhood, and Wayne State University.

Destinations
 Wayne State University
 Cathedral Church of St. Paul
 Detroit Institute of Arts
 Detroit Public Library
 Detroit Medical Center
 Charles H. Wright Museum of African American History
 Detroit Science Center
 Scarab Club

Station
The station is sponsored by Wayne State University. It is heated and features security cameras and emergency phones. Passenger amenities include Wi-Fi and arrival signs.

See also

Streetcars in North America

References

Tram stops of QLine
Railway stations in Michigan at university and college campuses
Railway stations in the United States opened in 2017